Meghave Meghave is a 2009 Kannada-language romance film directed by V. Nagendra Prasad starring Gracy Singh and Ram. The film released on 30 January 2009.

Cast
 Gracy Singh as Charmi aka Chandramukhi
 Ram as Raja
 Sudeep  (Guest Appearance)
 Ravi 
 Chethan 
 Gururaj Hosakote 
 Shobaraj 
 Karibasavaiah .
 Mandya Ramesh 
 Kashi 
 Myna

Soundtrack
The film features background score and soundtrack composed by V. Harikrishna and lyrics by V. Nagendra Prasad.

Reception 
R G Vijayasarathy of Rediff.com scored the film at 1 out of 5 stars and said "Hari Krishna's music is not in the league of his recent films like Ambari, Payana and Junglee. Dasari Seenu's photography shows glimpses of class while capturing the Nepal outdoor spots. In a nutshell, you can afford to give Meghave Meghave a miss."

Sify wrote "There are three melodious tunes scored by V Harikrishna. Namasthe Namasthe? opening song, Soorya Bandhaga?.and Huduga Huduga?. are good numbers. Cinematography ought to be pleasant to the eyes because the locations of Nepal are fresh to the Kannada audience." 

A critic from The New Indian Express wrote "Surprisingly, composer Hari Krishna doesn't live up to his reputation with "Huduga Huduga" being the only song that has some popular appeal. Dasari Seenu's cinematography isn't spectacular and Nagendra Prasad fails even as a dialogue writer. "Meghave Meghave" is a below average film".

References

External links
 

Indian romance films
2009 romance films
2009 films
2000s Kannada-language films
Films scored by V. Harikrishna